Pleasant Hill Lake is a 783-acre man made lake located near Perrysville and between Ashland and Richland counties in Ohio. Completed in 1936, Pleasant Hill Dam was built on the Clear Fork of the Mohican River. It is located in Ashland but the lake extends into Richland. The lake which was constructed by the United States Army Corps of Engineers, was built for the purpose of flood control.

References

Reservoirs in Ohio
Bodies of water of Richland County, Ohio
Bodies of water of Ashland County, Ohio
Muskingum Watershed Conservancy District
United States Army Corps of Engineers, Huntington District